White, Hot and Blue is a 1978 album by Johnny Winter. Following on from the previous year's Nothin' but the Blues, it again focuses on blues music but moves back to Winter's traditional formula of mixing original tracks, of which there are three, with cover versions.

Track listing 
"Walkin' by Myself" (James A. Lane a.k.a. Jimmy Rogers) - 3.28
"Slidin' In" (Johnny Winter) - 5.04
"Divin' Duck Blues" (Sleepy John Estes) - 3.27
"One Step at a Time" (Johnny Winter) - 3.58
"Nickel Blues" (Johnny Winter) - 3.33
"E.Z. Rider" (Traditional) - 4.00
"Last Night" (Walter Jacobs) - 5.35
"Messin' with the Kid" (Mel London) - 2.53
"Honest I Do" (Jimmy Reed) - 4.12

Personnel 
Johnny Winter - guitar, harmonica, vocals
Edgar Winter - keyboards, saxophone, vocals
Bobby Torello - drums
Isaac Payton Sweat - bass
Pat Rush - guitar
Pat Ramsey - harmonica
Tom Brock - mandolin

References

1978 albums
Johnny Winter albums
Albums produced by Johnny Winter
Blue Sky Records albums